Durbanville Nature Reserve is a  piece of protected land, located next to the Durbanville Racecourse in the Western Cape, South Africa.

This small triangular nature reserve is located on the border between two critically endangered vegetation types: Swartland Shale Renosterveld and Cape Flats Sand Fynbos. It was proclaimed in 1966 after Aristea lugens, a rare species of plant, was discovered here. The invasive alien vegetation was then cleared and the indigenous landscape was restored. The park is now home to around 130 species of plant - three of which exist only in Cape Town and ten of which are threatened with extinction. 
It is also a natural habitat for wild animals such as the angulate tortoise, the small grey mongoose and the endangered Cape rain frog.

See also

References

Nature reserves in Cape Town
Protected areas of the Western Cape